Brevianta is a genus of butterflies in the family Lycaenidae. The species of this genus are found in the Neotropical realm.

Species
Brevianta busa (Godman & Salvin, [1887])
Brevianta perpenna (Godman & Salvin, [1887])
Brevianta undulata (Hewitson, 1867)
Brevianta undulella (Strand, 1918)
Brevianta ematheon (Cramer, [1777])
Brevianta celelata (Hewitson, 1874)
Brevianta tolmides (C. & R. Felder, 1865)
Brevianta hyas (Godman & Salvin, [1887])

References

External links

Eumaeini
Lycaenidae of South America
Lycaenidae genera